Junius Chatman, Jr (born March 29, 1956) is an American former professional tennis player.

Born and raised in Richmond, Virginia, Chatman was the first African American to receive a tennis scholarship to the University of North Carolina. He won four Atlantic Coast Conference (ACC) championships, three in singles and one in doubles, before graduating in 1978.

Chatman reached a best singles ranking of 219 on the professional tour. In 1982 he made the round of 16 of Grand Prix tournaments at Stuttgart and Hilversum, as well as securing a doubles win over Jimmy Connors (and Mel Purcell) at Rotterdam. He won three doubles titles on the ATP Challenger circuit.

ATP Challenger finals

Doubles: 4 (3–1)

References

External links
 
 

1956 births
Living people
American male tennis players
African-American male tennis players
North Carolina Tar Heels men's tennis players
Tennis people from Virginia
Sportspeople from Richmond, Virginia